Möwe Bay (HPB21) is a harbour patrol boat of the Namibian Navy. Constructed and launched in Brazil, it was commissioned into the Namibian Navy in 2010. Its design was based on the Brazilian Navy's Marlim class. The vessel is used for patrolling Namibia's Harbours.

Description
The vessel is powered by two MTU 8V 2000 M92 diesel engines rated at  driving two shafts.

The vessel is can be armed with one  Oerlikon 20 mm cannon. The patrol boat has a complement of 8 including two officers.

Operational history
The boat is utilised by the Namibian Navy for Naval Policing around harbours, Coastal search and rescue, anti smuggling operations  and illegal fishing patrols

References

Ships built in Brazil
Ships of the Namibian Navy